Ernest George Horlock VC (also known as Ernest George Harlock) (24 October 1885 – 30 December 1917) was an English recipient of the Victoria Cross, the highest and most prestigious award for gallantry in the face of the enemy that can be awarded to British and Commonwealth forces.

Born 24 October 1885 to John and Emily Horlock; Horlock was 28 years old, married to Ethel, and a Bombardier in the 113th Battery, Royal Field Artillery, British Army during the First World War.

Gallantry in battle
On 15 September 1914 at Vendresse, France, Horlock performed the service for which he was awarded the Victoria Cross.

Horlock was reprimanded by his officers for not obeying orders to go to the hospital after both his first and second wounds had been dressed as well as being recommended for the V.C. He stuck by his gun until the evening, despite a third wound. He was mentioned in despatches by Sir John French on 8 October 1914.

The award was presented by King George V on 3 December 1914 at Merris, France while his unit was refitting, by this time Horlock had been promoted to Sergeant. He later was promoted to Battery Sergeant Major.

Horlock joined the Royal Field Artillery as a regular soldier before the First World War and for an unknown reason served as Harlock, possibly due to a clerical error on enlistment papers and subsequent records. His Victoria Cross was actually correctly engraved Horlock. His grave at Hadra Military Cemetery, Alexandria, bore the name Harlock until corrected by the Commonwealth Graves Commission in the late 1970s.

Death at sea
In December 1917 Horlock was one of 2,500 troops who sailed from Marseille aboard the troop ship  to join the Egyptian Expeditionary Force's Southern Palestine Offensive against the Ottoman Empire. Aragons escort, the destroyer , rescued 300 to 400 survivors, but then UC-34 sank her as well.

Horlock was one of 610 personnel killed in the attack. His body was recovered and buried in Hadra War Memorial Cemetery, Alexandria.

Monument in Hampshire

On 24 May 2001 (previously called Empire Day) a memorial to E.G. Horlock, VC was unveiled in St John's parish church, Langrish, Hampshire. The event was attended by Horlock descendants from all over the World. A contingent from 10 (Assaye) Battery (the successor of 113th Battery and the holders of the medal) was also present, in addition to members of Portsmouth Branch of the RAA and the RA Artificers' Association. During the ceremony a tribute was given by the General Secretary, Lieutenant Colonel MG Felton, and the memorial was unveiled by Dame Mary Fagan, Lord Lieutenant of Hampshire.

Memorial Paving Stone in Alton
On 15 September 2014 a memorial paving stone was unveiled near the War Memorial in Alton, Hampshire, to Bombardier Ernest Horlock (sic) on the hundredth anniversary of his VC service. There was a display in the nearby Assembly Rooms and, later in the day, the firing of an 18pdr field gun (similar to the type Horlock would have served with) in Anstey Park.

References

Monuments to Courage (David Harvey, 1999)
The Register of the Victoria Cross (This England, 1997)
VCs of the First World War - 1914 (Gerald Gliddon, 1994)

External links

1885 births
1917 deaths
British Army personnel of World War I
British Army recipients of the Victoria Cross
British military personnel killed in World War I
British World War I recipients of the Victoria Cross
People from Alton, Hampshire
People who died at sea
Royal Field Artillery soldiers